Tazoult is commune town in north-eastern Algeria.

Location
and centrally located in the wilaya of Batna. 

Since 1984 the commune of Tazoult consists of the following areas  : 
 Boukha 
 Bouzène 
 Chaabet El Ghoul 
 Chenatif 
 Draa Ben Sebbah 
Steward 
Latrèche 
 Markouna 
 Merfeg Sidi Belkeir 
 Oued Bouhayoun 
 Oustilli 
 Tazoult 
 Tifiracine 
 Touafez

History 
The Roman civitas of Lambèse was a city garrison, founded in the year 81 by the Third Roman Legion, under Titus. Marcus Aurelius built the city and under Septimius Severus (a North African) an imperial residence of the legate of Numidia.  Lambaesis, was for a time capital of Numidia , with a population of more than 1862 civilians. The city grew but when the legion was dissolved in 238, the city was deprived of its major economic support.

In the 5th century , the city was destroyed by the Berbers and disappearing almost completely under the Byzantines.

In modern times Italy sent their political prisoners to the town and, the French established a penal colony there in January 1850. It was guarded by a detachment of the 3rd Zouave regiments . A village populated by laborers, artisans and merchants formed around the prison. The settlement will create a full-function joint in 1869. Public buildings included a church, hospital and post office.
The prison of Lambaesis was known for its harsh conditions and hosted Algerian nationalists during the Algerian war of independence.

After independence, Lambèse was renamed and became known as Tazoult. The prison is still used and has attracted criticism for conditions contrary to human rights and is used to hold political opposition members.

The current mayor is Cherif Guedouar who replaced long term mayor Moussa Fellah in 2012.

Archaeology
Archaeological Heritage includes:
 Garrison Lambèse
 the Praetorian
The triumphal arch of Lambèse 
 The Roman Areana
 the Capitol 
 The temple of Aesculapius Lambèse, 
 The Roman amphitheater 
 Museum of Lambèse

Toponymy
The name of Tazoult is a Berber word for khol in Tuareg or antimony in other Algerian or Moroccan languages.

Population
 1880 = 4,732
 1966 = 64,813
 1977 = 9,314
 1984 = 11,000
 1998 = 22,114
 2008 = 27,493

Infrastructure
The town has two schools: the school Emir Abdelkader and Mohamed Slimane Technicum, three middle schools (CEM), thirteen primary schools and a vocational training center.  There are health facilities as well. The town has a museum and a library of culture and town hall. The town also boasts a stadium, three playgrounds, a sports hall and a swimming pool.

References

Communes of Batna Province
Algeria